The Earthquake Synod  was an English synod that took place on 21 May 1382 in the Blackfriars area of London, England.

William Courtenay, the Archbishop of Canterbury, convened the synod to address the emerging Lollard thinkers challenging the church.  In particular, the synod condemned John Wycliffe's twenty-four theses, although many had already been condemned as heresy by a synod at St. Paul's Cathedral in February 1377.  The synod also issued teachings on the doctrine of transubstantiation and friars. The synod got its name from the fact that the 1382 Dover Straits earthquake shook the city of London during its meetings.

References

Further reading
Cole, A. (2008). The Blackfriars Council, London, 1382. In Literature and Heresy in the Age of Chaucer (Cambridge Studies in Medieval Literature, pp. 3–22). Cambridge: Cambridge University Press. doi:10.1017/CBO9780511481420.002

Anglicanism
1382 in England
History of the City of London
Religion in the City of London
Catholic Church councils held in England
14th-century Catholic Church councils
14th century in London
Christianity in London